Noël Akchoté (born 7 December 1968) is a French guitarist in free improvisation, classical, experimental, and free jazz.

Career
Starting on guitar at when he was eight years old, he received lessons on classical guitar in school. When he was ten he saw a Baden Powell concert in Paris and was also impressed by Jimmy Gourley. At fourteen he was performing day and night in bars and restaurants. He dropped out of school and learned to play drums and bass. He attended workshops given by guitarists Philip Catherine, Mickey Baker, and Tal Farlow. During the 1990s he worked with Joey Baron, Lol Coxhill,  Glenn Ferris, Daniel Humair, Michel Portal, Sam Rivers, Aldo Romano, Louis Sclavis,  and Henri Texier. He started the record label Rectangle. He was a member of the Recyclers, Trash Corporation, and was a founder the Big Four in 2001 with Steven Bernstein, Bradley Jones, and Max Nagl. He has also played with Derek Bailey, Han Bennink, Tim Berne, Eugene Chadbourne, Marc Ducret, Christian Escoude, Fred Frith, Mary Halvorson, Ingrid Jensen, Adam Levy, George E. Lewis, Phil Minton, Evan Parker, Marc Ribot, and Herb Robertson.

Discography

As leader
 Soundpage(s) (Label Bleu, 1994)
 Somewhere Bi-Lingual (Siesta, 1997)
 Lust Corner (Winter & Winter, 1997)
 Noel Akchote & Bruno Meillier (Orkhestra, 1999)
 Alike Joseph (Rectangle, 2000)
 Rien (Winter & Winter, 2000)
 Simple Joseph (Rectangle, 2001)
 Perpetual Joseph (Rectangle, 2002)
 Lennyk.co.uk? (Signature, 2002)
 Impro-Micro-Acoustique (Blue Chopsticks, 2003)
 Adult Guitar (Blue Chopsticks, 2004)
 Sonny II (Winter & Winter, 2004)
 Ecume Ou Bave (Signature, 2004)
 Les Invisibles (Universal, 2006)
 So Lucky (Winter & Winter, 2007)
 Toi-Meme (Winter & Winter, 2008)

As co-leader
 Big Four, with Max Nagl, Steven Bernstein, Bradley Jones (Hatology, 2002)

As sideman
With Corin Curschellas
 Rappa Nomada (Schweiz, 1995)
 Valdun Voices of Rumantsch (Schweiz, 1997)
 Goodbye Gary Cooper (Make Up, 1999)

With David Grubbs
 Aux Noctambules (Rectangle, 1999)
 The Coxcomb (Rectangle, 1999)
 The Spectrum Between (Drag City, 2000)
 Thirty Minute Raven (Rectangle, 2001)
 Rickets & Scurvy (Drag City, 2002)

With others
 Derek Bailey, Close to the Kitchen (Rectangle, 1996)
 Jean-Jacques Birge, Sarajevo (Suite) L'Empreinte 1994)
 Mike Cooper, Island Songs (Nato, 1996)
 Jean-Louis Costes, Vivre Encore (Rectangle, 1996)
 Vincent Courtois, Translucide (Enja, 2000)
 Lol Coxhill, Xmas Songs (Rectangle, 1998)
 Fred Frith, Reel (Rectangle, 1996)
 Philippe Katerine, Nom De Code: Sacha (Rectangle, 2002)
 Phil Minton, My Chelsea (Rectangle, 2011)
 Evan Parker, Live at Les Instants Chavires (Leo, 1998)
 Sam Rivers, Configuration (Nato, 1996)
 Sam Rivers, Eight Day Journal (Nato, 1998)
 Henri Texier, Mad Nomad(s) (Label Bleu, 2002)
 Vert, Some Beans & an Octopus (Sonig, 2006)

Filmography
 1998 Le jour de Noël (short film by Thierry Jousse with Jacky Berroyer, Claire Denis, Antoine Chappey, Zinedine Soualem)
 1999 Exhibitions (by John B. Root, with Dolly Golden, Coralie, Karen Lancaume, Élodie Chérie)
 2001 Nom de Code : Sacha (short film by Thierry Jousse with Katerine, Margot Abascal, Anna Karina)
 2002 XYZ (by John B. Root, with Titof, Ovidie, Ksandra, Élodie Chérie)
 2004 Les Invisibles (by Thierry Jousse with Laurent Lucas, Lio, Michael Lonsdale, Margot Abascal)

Bibliography
 Philippe Robert, Musiques expérimentales. Une anthologie transversale d'enregistrements emblématiques. Le Mot et le Reste/GRIM. 2007.
 (Collective, edited by Franck Médioni), Albert Ayler : Témoignages sur un holy ghost, Le Mot et le Reste, 2010.

References

[ AllMusic]

French jazz guitarists
French guitarists
French male guitarists
Drag City (record label) artists
Living people
1968 births
French male jazz musicians
Winter & Winter Records artists